Raga (also known as Hano) is the language of northern Pentecost Island in Vanuatu. Like all Vanuatu languages, Raga belongs to the Oceanic subgroup of the Austronesian languages family. In old sources the language is sometimes referred to by the names of villages in which it is spoken, such as Bwatvenua (Qatvenua), Lamalanga, Vunmarama and Loltong.

It is the most conservative language of Pentecost Island, having preserved final vowels while also retaining the five-vowel system inherited from Proto-Oceanic, compared to other languages spoken on the island, which have all developed additional vowels in addition to pervasive vowel deletion.

With an estimated 6,500 native speakers (in the year 2000), Raga is the second most widely spoken of Pentecost's five native languages (after Apma), and the seventh largest vernacular in Vanuatu as a whole. There are significant communities of Raga speakers on Maewo island and in Port Vila and Luganville as a result of emigration from Pentecost. Walter Lini, the independence leader of Vanuatu, was a native Raga speaker.

The Raga spoken by most people today is heavily mixed with Bislama, Vanuatu's national language. The Turaga indigenous movement, based at Lavatmanggemu in north-eastern Pentecost, have attempted to purge the language of foreign influences by coining or rediscovering native words for introduced concepts such as "torch battery" (vat bongbongi, literally "night stones") and "hour" (ngguha, literally "movement"). Members of the Turaga movement write in Raga language using Avoiuli, a unique writing system inspired by local sand drawings.

Raga is generally considered an easy language to speak and learn, and is known as a second language by a number of speakers of other Vanuatu languages.

Modern Raga is relatively homogeneous, with no significant dialectal variation. A distinctive southern dialect of Raga, Nggasai, is now extinct; its last native speaker died in 1999.

Several grammatical sketches, vocabulary lists and short papers on Raga have been published, beginning with the work of R H Codrington and von der Gabelentz in the late 19th century, and a number of religious texts have been translated into the language.

Phonology
The consonants of Raga are as follows,

G is typically pronounced like the ch in Scottish "loch".

Prenasalization of the voiced plosives, such that b becomes mb (always voiced) and d becomes nd, occurs when the preceding consonant is nasal (m, n or ng). Thus mabu "rest" is pronounced mambu.

V, vw are labiodental, unlike in Apma to the immediate south, where they are bilabial .

Raga has the five basic vowels a, e, i, o and u. Vowels are not generally distinguished for length.

Word roots in Raga nearly always end with a vowel. However, word-final vowels are often dropped within phrases, so that, for example, tanga "basket" and maita "white" combine to make tang maita "white basket".

Stress occurs on the penultimate syllable of a word.

Grammar
Basic word order in Raga is subject–verb–object.

Pronouns
Personal pronouns are distinguished by person and number. They are not distinguished by gender. The basic pronouns are as follows:

Nouns
Plurality is indicated by placing ira before a noun:

manu = [the] bird
ira manu = [the] birds

Nouns may be suffixed to indicate whom an item belongs to. For example:

iha = name
ihaku = my name
ihamwa = your name
ihana = his/her name
ihan ratahigi = the chief's name

Possession may also be indicated by the use of possessive classifiers, separate words that occur before the noun and take possessive suffixes. These classifiers are:

no- for general possessions ("my basket")
bila- for things that are cared for, such as crops and livestock ("our pig")
ga- for things to be eaten ("your taro")
ma- for things to be drunk ("their water")

Historically there was also a classifier wa- for sugarcane to be chewed ("his sugarcane"); this has fallen out of use among younger speakers.

The possessive suffixes are as follows:

A verb may be transformed into a noun by the addition of a nominalising suffix -ana:

bwalo = to fight (verb)
bwaloana = a fight (noun)

Modifiers generally come after a noun:

vanua = island
vanua kolo = small island
vanua gairua = two islands

Verbs
Verbs in Raga are usually preceded by a subject pronoun and by a tense–aspect–mood marker.

The subject pronouns are as follows:

There is no 3rd person singular subject pronoun ("he/she/it").

Raga has five sets of tense–aspect–mood markers:

The full forms of these markers are used in the 3rd person singular, when there is usually no subject pronoun:

mwa lolia = he does it
nu lolia = he did it
vi lolia = he will do it

Elsewhere, short forms of these markers are suffixed to the subject pronoun:

nam lolia = I do it
nan lolia = I did it
nav lolia = I will do it

There are also dual (two-person) forms incorporating a particle ru "two":

ram lolia = they do it
ramuru lolia = the two of them do it

Historically there were trial (three-person) forms incorporating a particle dol or tol, but these have fallen out of use.

Imperatives can consist of a verb with no marker. In third person forms, there is a marker na-:

Mai teti! = Come here!
Ihamwa na sabuga = May your name be holy

There is a pattern of verb-consonant mutation whereby v at the start of a verb changes to b, vw to bw, g to ngg, and t to d. This mutation occurs in imperfective aspect, and in the presence of the additive marker mom:

nan vano = I went
nam bano = I am going

Negative sentences are indicated with the two-part marker  "not", which encloses the verb and anything suffixed to it:

nan hav lolia tehe = I didn't do it

The passive voice can be formed by attaching the suffix -ana to the verb:

nu lolia = he did it
nu loliana = it was done

The direct object immediately follows the verb. Some object pronouns take the form of suffixes attached to the verb:

In some cases a particle -ni- interposes between the verb and the object pronoun:

nam doronia = I like it

Sample phrases

References

External links
 The Languages of Pentecost Island - information on Raga
 Leo huri ganisabuga Anglican Holy Communion from the Book of Common Prayer in Raga, digitized by Richard Mammana and Charles Wohlers

Languages of Vanuatu
Penama languages